Fapla International Cricket Ground is located in Dhangadhi, Kailali, Nepal. It is two kilometres north of Chauraha on the bank of Mohana River in Boradadi lies Fapla with an area of 1369 sq. meter (31 Bigaha-incorporating the forest and school nearby). A small part of that is being used for the ground.

History

The brighter its future seems the darker was its past. It was part of a forest and was used by the local people as a free space to graze their cattle limiting its identity to a wasted pasture. A few kids would turn up now and then to play football albeit it was no sports venue. But with inception of Nepal Premier League, Fapla has now grabbed a new level of popularity throughout the nation.

Before Fapla, every cricket tournament in Dhangadhi was played in Dhangadi Rangashala. But the Rangashala was built into a football stadium for 6th national games. So cricket in Dhangadhi was shifted to Zonal Police Ground. Zonal Police Ground is in the heart of Dhangadhi] and although was easier for the spectators to come there and watch the game but the ground, being in police territory-the permission to host tournaments did not come easy.

It was those times when had just won WCL-4 and with Nepal's success in ACC tournaments more people in Dhangadi got involved with cricket. Consequently, more tournaments were being hosted. And till today there is always a cricket tournament going on in Dhanghadi. Zonal Police being the only ground back then was thus mostly occupied.

Last year Dhangadhi Cricket Academy in its very first year of establishment set eye on starting a cricket league. It faced the same problem as many cricket tournaments face in Dhanghadi-unavailability of cricket ground. Subash Shahi then put forward an idea as developing Fapla as a cricket venue and in future upgrade with facilities of international standard. Fapla was approved for the first edition of Dhangadi Cricket League.

“The condition of this place was miserable then” Shahi remembers the dusty ground in which first edition of DCA was played. “I saw a dream of international matches being played here and invested my personal money in its construction”, he explained. Right now Fapla is not just lusty green turf but also getting concrete parfaits for spectators.

Description and Prospects

The boundaries are mentioned 70 m long in the map but the ground being constructed for NPL has is around 60-65m boundaries.

Selector and Cricket expert Basu Dev Joshi points out that Nepal needs more grounds to raise Nepal's cricketing standard.

“Playing in the well equipped grounds (one with turf pitches) will help a player to sharpen his talent,” said Amit Poudel, a U16 national player who remembers playing all matches in Dhangadi in mats. When completed Fapla will be the first cricket ground with turf wickets in Dhanghadi.

The cost of construction of Fapla Cricket Ground is estimated at around 1 crore but when it completed will give back a lot more. It will surely give Dhanghadi better chances at National Tournament. Also with better infrastructures Nepal will rise higher in ICC's Cricket development ranking. Fapla cricket ground will likely be completed in few days. Construction of a ground is a big deal in itself but what important once the construction is completed is its maintenance-if that is ensured Fapla will surely be a faith changer for Nepal cricket.

Organizer of the SPA Cup, President of Dhangadhi Cricket Academy (DCA), vice-president of Dhangadhi Cricket Association, and once opener for Region No.6 Baitadi; Shahi is taken almost as a father figure by budding cricketers here. Shahi has now set an eye on developing Dhangadhi as “Cricket Capital of Nepal” and is currently investing his time on building the Fapla Cricket Ground.

References

2014 establishments in Nepal
Cricket grounds in Nepal